José Trueba (23 May 1903 – 11 November 1956) was a Spanish racing cyclist. He rode in the 1930 Tour de France. His brother Vicente was also a professional cyclist.

References

External links
 

1903 births
1956 deaths
Spanish male cyclists
Cyclists from Cantabria
People from Torrelavega